Alojzów may refer to:
Alojzów, Chełm County in Lublin Voivodeship (east Poland)
Alojzów, Hrubieszów County in Lublin Voivodeship (east Poland)
Alojzów, Masovian Voivodeship (east-central Poland)